In enzymology, a sulfhydrogenase, also known as sulfur reductase, is an enzyme that catalyzes the reduction of elemental sulfur or polysulfide to hydrogen sulfide using hydrogen as electron donor.

This enzyme belongs to the family of oxidoreductases.  The systematic name of this enzyme class is H2:polysulfide oxidoreductase.

References

Further reading 

 

EC 1.12.98
Enzymes of unknown structure